Wulinmen is a metro station on Line 2 of Hangzhou Metro in China. It is located in Xihu District. This station has become an interchange station between Line 2 and Line 3 when the station of Line 3 was opened on 20 July 2022.

Gallery

References

Railway stations in Zhejiang
Railway stations in China opened in 2017
Hangzhou Metro stations